CoffeeCon is a festival for coffee enthusiasts. CoffeeCon travels to major coffee cities in the United States. It was created by coffee author and video producer, Kevin Sinnott, who wrote the book The Art & Craft of Coffee and produced a how to video called Coffee Brewing Secrets.

History
While working on specialized projects, Sinnott noticed several industry business-to-business coffee events such as the Specialty Coffee Association of America and the National Coffee Association. While some local coffee shops were holding brewing seminars, there were simply no large scale festivals exclusively for coffee consumers. He decided to turn his book and his video into a live event. He created CoffeeCon as a place where coffee enthusiasts could taste samples from regional coffee roasters side-by-side, learn about coffee from national and local coffee experts and attend coffee topic classes on almost every brewing method. He hosts the event and calls it a coffee meet-up.

The first CoffeeCon was held on February 25, 2012, and started with a grant for the local tourism commission in Warrenville, IL. It attracted over 1,000 consumers. The second event was held on May 4, 2013, again, in Warrenville, IL  In 2014, Sinnott decided it was time to take the show on the road. His first stop was Chicago on April 12, 2014, at the Zhou B Art Center. He wanted to add art elements to enhance the coffeehouse flavor of the event as well as a Writer's Roundtable Panel to discuss the topic of new media writing. The next stop was San Francisco on July 26, 2014, at Terra Galleries.

CoffeeCon LA was held on November 8, 2014, at Mack Sennett Studios in Silver Lake. Mack Sennett was a silent movie director and produced the KeyStone Cops. Kevin Sinnott stated "It was like a coming home." I believe Mack would be proud that another Sinnott was at work in his studio. CoffeeCon cited Mack Sennett Studios historic connection with CoffeeCon's founder.

CoffeeCon NYC was held on March 7, 2015.

CoffeeCon Chicago occurred on July 25, 2015.

On January 27–28, 2017, CoffeeCon held its first ever, multi-day convention. The event was held at the Seattle Center Armory, in Seattle, Washington.

Upcoming conventions

Coffee Con is now online weekly classes due to the COVID-19 pandemic.

Features of the convention
George Howell and Kenneth Davids teach a special Taste Like An Expert seminar that teaches consumers the vocabulary of coffee tasting and trains the palate of the attendees. Coffee growers are invited to teach about coffee sustainability. Popular classes include grinding, water, hand pour methods and Turkish Coffee. Coffeemaker designers such as Alan Adler the inventor of the AeroPress and Joe Behm the inventor of the Brazen coffeemaker conduct classes on how to use their coffeemakers. Home roasting hobbyists are given space to give roasting demos. The Future of Coffee panel was a new first at CoffeeCon 2014 San Francisco and is present at every CoffeeCon.

References

External links
 
 Twitter page

Coffee culture
Food and drink festivals